Tolga is a municipality in Biskra Province, Algeria. Located in south-east Algeria, 363 km south of the capital Algiers(34° 43' 00" N and 5° 23' 00" E). Tolga is well known internationally for high-quality dates (Deglet Nour). It has more than 500,000 date palm trees. Most dates produced are exported.

History
The Tolga Oasis was occupied by the Romans during republican times and a small town established at Lioua about 8km south. Large rectangular stones from the Roman era have been found in old Tolga testify to their presence in the Oasis.

The city was the headquarters of the powerful Confederation of Dhouaouda and Ryah from Beni Hilal, a Bedouin clan from southern Egypt where they have migrated under the leadership of the Fatimids between the 10th and 11th centuries.  

According to the Andalusian historian and geographer Al-Bakri, "Tolga north of Bentious, consists of several cities (...) One of those cities is inhabited by people of mixed blood, the other by Arabs of Yemeni origin, and the third by a people belonging to Qays. "

References

Communes of Biskra Province